St Peter's Church is an Anglican church in the town of Burnley, Lancashire, England. It is an active parish church in the Diocese of Blackburn and the archdeaconry of Blackburn. The oldest part of the church, the lower tower, dates from the 15th century, and there are several later additions and restorations. St Peter's is recorded in the National Heritage List for England as a designated Grade II* listed building.

History
St Peter's lies close to the banks of the River Brun. There was a church on the site prior to 1122; this was largely rebuilt in the 1530s by Thomas Sellars and Nicholas Craven. The lower part of the tower is the oldest part of the current building and dates from the 15th or 16th century. There have been enough additions and alterations to the tower that Hartwell & Pevsner (2009) state that "little genuine C16 work survives". A gallery was added to the west in 1735 to accommodate the growing population of Burnley. The south aisle was rebuilt in 1789, and the north aisle in 1802. An upper part was added to the tower in 1803. Interior restoration work took place in 1854 by Miles Thompson, who built nave arcades and clerestory. In 1872–1873, the chancel was enlarged.

Present day and assessment
St Peter's was designated a Grade II* listed building on 10 November 1951.  The Grade II* designation—the second highest of the three grades—is for "particularly important buildings of more than special interest". An active church in the Church of England, St Peter's is part of the diocese of Blackburn, which is in the Province of York. It is in the archdeaconry of Blackburn and the Deanery of Burnley.

Architecture

Exterior
St Peter's is constructed of sandstone with slate roofs, and is in the late Perpendicular style. Its plan consists of a nave with a west tower, aisles to the north and south, and a chancel to the east. The tower is of four stages and has four-stage square, angled buttresses that reach halfway up the tower. The fourth stage of the tower is set back and has a crenellated parapet with pinnacles. There is a west doorway with a pointed arch and a hood mould.

Interior and fittings

Internally, the tower is  square. It has a vice (spiral staircase) in the south-east corner that is accessed through an external door. It has a clerestory and arcades with arches over slender piers. There are two arches between the nave and the chancel.

Churchyard
The churchyard contains what Hartwell & Pevsner describe as a "good crop" of monuments, including some chest tombs from the 19th century. South of the church there is a group of monuments including one dedicated to the Chaffer family, one dedicated to the Kay family and one dedicated to the Waddington family; all of these have been given a Grade II designation by English Heritage. It is constructed of sandstone in the Gothic Revival style and has corner pinnacles. It is a chest tomb built of sandstone and solid granite.

The scientist and astronomer Richard Towneley was buried at St Peter's Church in 1707.

The sandstone churchyard wall and gates date from about 1807. Additionally, there is a retaining wall on the north and west sides of the churchyard that also dates from about 1807, but includes some parts from 1736. This wall is built of coursed sandstone rubble. The churchyard walls, gates and retaining wall have all been given a Grade II listing by English Heritage.

Gallery

See also

Grade II* listed buildings in Lancashire
Listed buildings in Burnley
Places of worship in Burnley

References

Footnotes

Sources

External links

Peter's, Burnley
Church of England church buildings in Lancashire
Diocese of Blackburn
Grade II* listed churches in Lancashire